The Rochester and Syracuse Railroad was incorporated on August 1, 1850. The Auburn and Rochester Railroad Company was incorporated May 13, 1836, and opened in August 1841. The Auburn and Syracuse Railroad Company was incorporated May 1, 1834, and opened in June 1838. Both railroads combined on August 1, 1850, and the consolidated company constructed the Direct Railway between Syracuse and Rochester.

New York Central railroad 

The rail was consolidated into The New York Central Railroad Company under the act of 1853.

References

Predecessors of the New York Central Railroad
Defunct New York (state) railroads
Railway companies established in 1850
Railway companies disestablished in 1853
Defunct railroads in Syracuse, New York
Subdivisions of the New York Central Railroad